Marinus Bee (1971) is a Surinamese politician, Chairman of the National Assembly of Suriname, and sports manager. As sports manager, he was chairman of the Albina Sports Foundation for ten years, and since 2014 chairman of S.V. Papatam. Bee has been elected to the National Assembly for the General Liberation and Development Party (ABOP) since 2010 for the Marowijne District.

Biography
Bee was born as the oldest child of four in Moengo, and spend his youth in Paramaribo. He graduated from the Anton de Kom University in law, and in 2020 was accredited Master of Business Administration.

In 1999, Bee was invited to join the ABOP by Ronnie Brunswijk. He participated in the 2000 elections, but he only received 800 votes. In 2010 Bee was elected for the first time to the National Assembly. In 2014, Bee became Chairman of the Party Congress of ABOP. In the 2020 elections, Bee was elected to the National Assembly for the third consecutive time. On 13 July, Ronnie Brunswijk was elected as Vice President of Suriname, and Marinus Bee became his replacement as Chairman of the National Assembly of Suriname on 14 July 2020. Dew Sharman was installed as Vice Chairman on 29 June 2020.

References

Living people
1971 births
Anton de Kom University of Suriname alumni
General Liberation and Development Party politicians
Members of the National Assembly (Suriname)
Speakers of the National Assembly (Suriname)
Surinamese football managers
Surinamese politicians